This is a confirmed referenced overview list of notable people on the spectrum of asexuality, who have either been open about their sexuality or for which reliable sources exist. The number of notables in the list is likely to be several times higher due to fact that many famous people have hidden their sexual orientations. Famous persons who are only thought or rumored to be asexual are not included in this list.

People on the asexual spectrum lack sexual attraction to others or experience low or absent interest in or desire for sexual activity. The spectrum includes sub-identities, including gray asexuality and demisexuality. Asexual individuals may represent about one percent of the population.

Many people who identify as asexual also identify with other labels. These other identities include how they define their gender and their romantic orientation. They will oftentimes integrate these characteristics into a greater label that they identify with. Regarding romantic or emotional aspects of sexual orientation or sexual identity, for example, asexuals may identify as heterosexual, lesbian, gay, bisexual, queer or by the following terms to indicate that they associate with the romantic, rather than sexual, aspects of sexual orientation:

 aromantic; lack of romantic attraction towards anyone
 biromantic; by analogy to bisexual
 heteroromantic; by analogy to heterosexual
 homoromantic; by analogy to homosexual
 panromantic; by analogy to pansexual

List

See also 

 List of fictional asexual characters
 List of Asexual, Non-binary, and Pansexual characters in television and radio

References 

Asexual